Hokejski klub Triglav Kranj, commonly referred to as HK Triglav or simply Triglav, is an ice hockey club from Kranj, Slovenia. The club was founded in 1968.

Honours
Slovenian Championship
Runners-up: 2021–22

International Hockey League (IHL) 
 Winners: 2020–21, 2021–22

References

External links
Official website  
Hokej.si profile 

Ice hockey clubs established in 1968
Ice hockey teams in Slovenia
Slovenian Ice Hockey League teams
Inter-National League teams
Slohokej League teams
Yugoslav Ice Hockey League teams
Sport in Kranj
1968 establishments in Slovenia